Alternanthera corymbiformis is a species of plant in the family Amaranthaceae. It is endemic to Ecuador.  Its natural habitats are subtropical or tropical moist montane forests and subtropical or tropical dry shrubland. It is threatened by habitat loss.

References

Flora of Ecuador
corymbiformis
Vulnerable plants
Taxonomy articles created by Polbot